Scopula pithogona is a moth of the  family Geometridae. It is found on Java, Borneo and Sulawesi. The habitat consists of dipterocarp forests.

The ground colour of the adults is whitish with pale fawn markings.

References

Moths described in 1938
pithogona
Moths of Asia